Florence McClintock (or McLintock, 21 March 1916 – 15 October 2008) was an Australian cricket player. McClintock played two Test matches for the Australia national women's cricket team. McLintock married George Albert Bowe in October 1939. McClintock died on 15 October 2008, at the age of 92.

References

1916 births
2008 deaths
Australia women Test cricketers
Australian women cricketers